Club Esportiu Carroi is an Andorran football club based in the capital city of Andorra la Vella. The club currently plays in Segona Divisió.

History
Founded in 2014 as a football academy CE Carroi has been a successful club at the national youth level also taking part in internationally renowned youth competitions in Europe, such as the Mediterranean International Cup or the Andorra International Cup.

Although, the club is known by his football academy and school, in July 2015 CE Carroi created a senior team to compete at the highest levels in the country thus being admitted in Segona Divisió.

CE Carroi finished 2nd at the end of the 2015-16 season in Segona Divisió, set to compete in a two-legged relegation play-off against the 7th placed club from Primera Divisió FC Encamp. It was announced that Encamp were awarded the tie against CE Carroi 3-0 due illegal lineup during the first leg of the relegation play-offs, therefore Encamp remained in the top flight and Carroi remained in the second tier one more season. The club reached the promotion at the end of the 2018–19 Segona Divisió after winning the Primera Divisió relegation play-offs against FC Lusitanos.

Colors and badge

The club takes the name after one of the most emblematic mountains of the country, Pic de Carroi (elevation 2317m), located in the valley of the cities of Andorra la Vella and Escaldes-Engordany.

The mountain is represented in the club crest along with the Andorran flag colors and the colors of the team itself.

Purple and white are the colors of the club. These colors were also worn by other historical clubs of the capital city such as CE Principat or Constelació Esportiva d'Andorra la Vella.

Honours
Segona Divisió:
Runners-up (2): 2015–16, 2018–19

Current squad 
As of 21 September 2022

References

External links
CE Carroi at FAF.AD

Football clubs in Andorra
Association football clubs established in 2014
2014 establishments in Andorra